Hyposmocoma metrosiderella is a species of moth of the family Cosmopterigidae. It was first described by Lord Walsingham in 1907. It is endemic to the Hawaiian island of Kauai.

The larvae feed on Metrosideros species. The larva makes a rough case of frass with a loose lip. The case is somewhat flattened, pouch shaped, with a short obtuse curved attenuation posteriorly, the middle is widened and the whole case is of a dull dark brownish and fuscous color.

External links

metrosiderella
Endemic moths of Hawaii
Biota of Kauai
Moths described in 1907
Taxa named by Thomas de Grey, 6th Baron Walsingham